Skeikampen is a mountain located in Gausdal Municipality in Innlandet county, Norway. The area is heavily dependent on recreation which is dominated by the Skeikampen Alpine Centre plus hundreds of holiday cottages.

Attractions
The Skeikampen Alpine Centre is located on the montain and it offers both ski lifts and pistes. The first cross-country tourists arrived in 1895 and the first ski lift was built in 1959. The centre is now one of Norway's largest skiing facilities. The area also has an 18-hole golf course. Tourists travel to Lillehammer, the regional transportation hub, before taking local transportation to Skeikampen. Local buses offer several daily bus departures to Skeikampen.

Etymology
The first element of the name is the Old Norse word   meaning "race course" suggesting that there may have been such a race track here in medieval times. The last element is the finite form of kamp which means "mountain".

See also
List of mountains of Norway by height

References

External links
Skeikampen website
Thon Skeikampen Resort website

Gausdal
Mountains of Innlandet
Ski areas and resorts in Norway